Harry Langley was an architect of the National Park Service.  He was born in England.  He retired in 1957.

A number of his works are listed on the U.S. National Register of Historic Places.

Works include:
Canyon Overlook Trail, across hwy. from parking area at E end of Zion-Mt. Carmel Tunnel to a point directly above the Great Arch of Zion, Springdale, Utah (Langley, Harry), NRHP-listed
Emerald Pools Trail, foot bridge across hwy. from Utah Parks Lodge proceeding W to the Lower Emerald Pool, Springdale, Utah (Langley, Harry), NRHP-listed
Grotto Camping Ground North Comfort Station, Grotto Picnic Area near Grotto Residence E of Scenic Dr., Springdale, Utah (Langley, Harry), NRHP-listed
Oak Creek Irrigation Canal, W side of the N Fork of Virgin River 1/8 mi. N of Virgin River Bridge to the N side of Watchman Campground Entrance Rd., Springdale, Utah (Langley, Harry), NRHP-listed

References

American architects